The 2006 Surat flood occurred over 7–10 August 2006, which affected Surat, India, and nearby villages. About 80–95% of Surat was flooded. 

The sudden release of a large amount of water into the Tapti River from the Ukai Dam caused the flood. The Government of Gujarat described the flood as a natural disaster, while reports from the People's Committee on Gujarat Floods of August 2006 and the Surat Citizens' Council Trust's Committee, described the flood as being the result of mismanagement.

History of floods in Surat 
In the 20th century the city of Surat has suffered from some 20 floods. The 1968 flood was one of the major floods with peak water flow of about 15 lakh cubic foot per second (cfs or cusec), while the 1970 flood had a peak flow about 13.14 lakh cfs. 

The Ukai Dam was constructed in 1972, flood control was one of the objectives of the dam's construction. After the dam was constructed 90 km upstream from Surat, there were no major floods until 1994. The floods of 1978 and 1979 were effectively managed by the dam.

In the 1998 flood more than 30% area of Surat was flooded due to the release of water from Ukai Dam.

Causes 
Due to heavy rainfall during 2006 in upstream basin areas, the inflow at Ukai Dam increased. The water level of the dam reservoir was increasing rapidly.

The inflow at dam was 85,958 cfs on 5 August 8 am, then rises to 330,216 cfs on 6 August 8 pm. On the morning of 7 August it became 853,679 cfs. By that time the reservoir was already 90% full, leaving very little empty space left to accommodate the floodwater coming from upstream. The inflow was still increasing. The peak inflow during the flood was about 1,200,000 cfs, but it lasted only for two hours.

Operating the gates of the dams increased the outflow rapidly. The outflow increased from 124,920 on 6 August, 8 am cfs, to 409,004 cfs on 7 August 8.00 am. Maintaining the same pace of increase the outflow was increased to a peak of 907,316 cfs at 8 pm on 8 August. The heavy outflow of about 900,000 cfs for a prolonged period of time caused the flood in Surat and other downstream villages. The high tide of the sea during the flood further reduced the drainage capacity of the river and worsened the damage due to flooding.

The Government of Gujarat described the flood as a natural disaster, while reports from the People's Committee on Gujarat Floods of August 2006 and the Surat Citizens' Council Trust's Committee, described the flood as being the result of mismanagement.

See also 

 2005 Gujarat flood
 2017 Gujarat flood
 2019 Vadodara flood

References

Further reading 
SURAT FLOODS: HOW IT WAS AN[sic PREVENTABLE DISASTER], SANDRP-South Asia Network on Dams, Rivers and People
 PEOPLE’S COMMITTEE REPORT, SANDRP-South Asia Network on Dams, Rivers and People
Lessons from Massive Floods of 2006 in Surat City

Natural disasters in India
2006 disasters in India
History of Gujarat (1947–present)
2006 floods in Asia
History of Surat
Floods in Gujarat